The Simpsons is an American animated sitcom that debuted on December 17, 1989, on the Fox network. The show is the longest-running prime time scripted television series in the United States. It has won many different awards, including 34
Emmy awards, 34 Annie Awards, nine Environmental Media Awards, twelve Writers Guild of America Awards, six Genesis Awards, eight People's Choice Awards, three British Comedy Awards, among other awards. Episodes of the show have won 11 Emmys in the Primetime Emmy Award for Outstanding Animated Program (For Programming less than One Hour) category. However, The Simpsons has never been nominated for Outstanding Comedy Series, although the show was submitted in the category in 1993 and 1994. James L. Brooks, an executive producer on the show, won eleven Emmys for The Simpsons as well as ten for other shows and holds the record for most Primetime Emmys won by a single person, with 21, The Simpsons was the first animated series to be given a Peabody Award, won a second Peabody in 2020, and in 2000 the Simpson family was awarded a star on the Hollywood Walk of Fame. As of 2022, The Simpsons have received a total of 100 Emmy nominations.

The Simpsons Movie, released in 2007, was nominated for several major awards, including a Golden Globe Award, while The Longest Daycare, a short film released in 2012, became the franchise's first production to be nominated for an Academy Award.

The Simpsons also holds two world records from the Guinness World Records: Longest-Running Primetime Animated Television Series and Most Guest Stars Featured in a Television Series.

Awards for The Simpsons

Annie Awards
First awarded in 1972, the Annie Awards are given exclusively to animated programs. The Simpsons has won 34 Annies, including 12 straight in the Best Animated Television Production category and winning in 2015 and 2016 for Best General Audience Animated TV/Broadcast Production.

* denotes nominated works with awards pending presentation and announcement

British Comedy Awards

The Simpsons has won three British Comedy Awards. Matt Groening also won a special award for Outstanding Contribution to Comedy in 2004.

Primetime Emmy Awards
The Simpsons has won 34 Primetime Emmy Awards in four categories, but has been nominated for 78 awards in nine different categories. Two of these nominations were for "Simpsons Roasting on an Open Fire", which was nominated in 1990 as a separate cartoon because officially it is considered a TV special and not a part of the series, however it is included in these statistics. The show's best year was 1992, when it won six Emmys, all for Outstanding Voice-Over Performance. Until 2009, the Outstanding Voice-Over Performance Emmy was awarded by a committee, so there were no nominations.

The Simpsons has been nominated for Primetime Emmy Award for Outstanding Animated Program (For Programming less than One Hour) every year except 1993, 1994 and 2014. 1993 marked the first year that the producers of The Simpsons did not submit episodes for the Primetime Emmy Award for Outstanding Animated Program (For Programming less than One Hour) Primetime Emmy Award. Prior to 1993, the series had only been allowed to compete in the animation category, but in early 1993 the rules were changed so that animated television shows would be able to submit nominations in the Outstanding Comedy Series category. The producers submitted "A Streetcar Named Marge" and "Mr. Plow" but the Emmy voters were hesitant to pit cartoons against live action programs, and The Simpsons did not receive a nomination. Several critics saw the show's failure to gain a nomination as one of the biggest snubs for that year. The Simpsons' crew again submitted episodes for "Outstanding Comedy Series" the next season, but these again were not nominated. Since then, the show has submitted episodes in the animation category.

Primetime Emmy Award for Outstanding Animated Program (For Programming less than One Hour)

Outstanding Voice-Over Performance

In 2014, the award was split into two different categories, Outstanding Character Voice-Over Performance and Outstanding Narrator.  Nominations and wins in 2014 and after are in the Character Voice-Over category.

Outstanding Music and Lyrics

Outstanding Music Composition for a Series (Dramatic Underscore)

Outstanding Music Direction

Outstanding Main Title Theme Music

Outstanding Sound Mixing for a Comedy Series or a Special

Outstanding Sound Mixing for a Comedy or Drama Series (Half-Hour) and Animation

Outstanding Editing for a Miniseries or a Special

Outstanding Individual Achievement in Animation

Environmental Media Awards

The Simpsons has won nine Environmental Media Awards. All of the wins and most of their nominations were in the Best Television Episodic Comedy category, including 2016 for "Teenage Mutant Milk-Caused Hurdles" but the series received a nomination for the Turner Award in 2005, which is given to "the scripted, primetime television episode that best deals with the issue of population growth and responsibility".

Genesis Awards

The Genesis Awards are given out annually by the Humane Society of the United States "to the news and entertainment media for shining that spotlight into the darkest corners of animal abuse and exploitation."

Golden Reel Awards
The Golden Reel Awards are presented annually by the Motion Picture Sound Editors. The Simpsons has been nominated in the Best Sound Editing in Television Animation – Music category five times. In 1998, the show was nominated for Best Sound Editing – Television Animated Specials, and won.

People's Choice Awards

Writers Guild of America Awards
The Simpsons has won thirteen Writers Guild of America Awards. The Animation category was introduced in 2003, and although the Futurama episode "Godfellas" won it in 2003, The Simpsons began to dominate the category, winning the award from 2004 to 2010 and 2012 to 2015, receiving a total of 57 nominations in the category. In 2008, three of the series' writers received a nomination for Video game writing. In 2009, the writers received their first nomination in the comedy series category. In 2011, the show's writers received two nominations in the category, and lost the award to Futurama'''s "The Prisoner of Benda". In 2012 the show received four nominations, and Joel H. Cohen won his second WGA award for "Homer the Father". In 2013 the show received three nominations, and Jeff Westbrook won his third WGA award for "Ned 'n' Edna's Blend Agenda".  In 2014 the show received three nominations and Joel H. Cohen won his third WGA award for "A Test Before Trying".  In 2015 Brian Kelley won for "Brick Like Me".  In 2019 Stephanie Gillis won for "Bart’s Not Dead". In 2020 Dan Vebber won for "Thanksgiving of Horror".  In 2005 Don Payne won the Paul Selvin Award for "Fraudcast News".

In 2006, long time writers Al Jean and Mike Reiss were given the Animation Writers Caucus Animation Award which is given to writers that "advanced the literature of animation in film and/or television through the years and who has made outstanding contributions to the profession of the animation writer." In 2010 long-time writer Mike Scully received this award, and in 2012 series creator Matt Groening received the award.  In 2013, series co-developer and long-time Executive Producer Sam Simon received this honor.

Animation

Comedy series

Paul Selvin award

Video game writing

Other awards

In 1997, The Simpsons became the first animated series to win a Peabody Award, and won it "for providing exceptional animation and stinging social satire, both commodities which are in extremely short supply in television today." In 2020 The Simpsons won a Peabody Institutional Award.  In 2000, The Simpsons were given a star on the Hollywood Walk of Fame. This applies to The Simpsons in person, not the series. The star is located at 7021 Hollywood Blvd.<ref>'The Simpsons in the Hollywood Walk of Fame Directory. Retrieved on October 17, 2007. </ref>

The Simpsons has never won a Golden Globe Award, but was nominated in 2002 in the Best Television Series – Musical or Comedy category, which it would lose to Curb Your Enthusiasm. In 1998, the series was nominated for a British Academy Television Awards in the Best International Programme Or Series category, but would lose to The Larry Sanders Show. In 1996, the "Homer³" segment of "Treehouse of Horror VI" was awarded the Ottawa International Animation Festival grand prize.

Awards for The Simpsons Movie

The Simpsons Movie was released on July 27, 2007, and has been a financial success, grossing over $500,000,000 worldwide.

Awards for The Longest Daycare
The Longest Daycare is a 3D, short film starring Maggie Simpson, which was shown prior to screenings of Ice Age: Continental Drift, on July 13, 2012, in the United States.

References
General
 
 

Specific

External links

 
 

Simpsons, The
Awards